Poedit (formerly poEdit) is a shareware and cross-platform gettext catalog (.po file) editor to aid in the process of language localisation.  According to WordPress developer Thord Hedengren, Poedit is "one of the most popular programs" for editing portable language files.

It is written in C++ and depends on some subclasses from the wxWidgets, but utilizes graphical control elements from the GTK library.

References

External links
 

PO editors
Shareware
Software using the MIT license
Software that uses wxWidgets
Computer-assisted translation software that uses GTK
Computer-assisted translation software for Linux